Germany competed at the 2016 European Athletics Championships in Amsterdam, Netherlands, between 6 and 10 July 2016. A delegation of 104 athletes were sent to represent the country.

Medals

Results
Men

Track & road events

Field Events

Combined events – Decathlon

Women

Track & road events

Field Events

Combined events – Heptathlon

References

Nations at the 2016 European Athletics Championships
Germany at the European Athletics Championships
European Athletics Championships